The Union of the Salamancan People (UPSa), officially Union of the Salamancan People – Citizens for Salamanca, was a Spanish political party established in 2002 and dissolved in 2014 based in Salamanca which is aligned with Libertas. It was founded by José María Moreno Balmisa, a former DSC and People's Party member. In 2006 the organization signed a pact of cooperation with the Leonese People's Union. In July 2014 UPS joined Ciudadanos.

Election results

References

External links 
 Official Website (Spanish)

Libertas.eu
Province of Salamanca
Political parties established in 2002
2002 establishments in Spain